Daniel Bartolotta (born 9 January 1955) is a former Uruguayan football player, who currently coaches Santa Tecla FC in Primera División de Fútbol de El Salvador.

Career
Born in Montevideo, Bartolotta began playing professional football with local side Defensor Sporting at age 17. The central midfielder spent most of his career playing abroad, moving to Spain for five seasons in 1975, before finishing his career playing in Mexico.

References

External links
 
 
 

1955 births
Living people
Footballers from Montevideo
Uruguayan footballers
Uruguayan expatriate footballers
Uruguay international footballers
Defensor Sporting players
Deportivo de La Coruña players
Real Oviedo players
Tigres UANL footballers
C.F. Monterrey players
Club Puebla players
Liga MX players
Expatriate football managers in Mexico
Expatriate footballers in Mexico
Expatriate footballers in Spain
Uruguayan expatriate sportspeople in Mexico
Uruguayan expatriate sportspeople in Spain
Association football forwards
Uruguayan football managers